Paul I Peter Massad (born 16 February 1806 in Ashqout, Lebanon – died on 18 April 1890 in Bkerké, Lebanon) (or Boulos Boutros Massaad, Mas'ad) was the 70th Maronite Patriarch of Antioch from 1854 until his death in 1890.

Life

Paul Peter Massad was born in the village of Ashqout, in the Keserwan District, Lebanon on February 16, 1806.

He studied in the seminary of 'Ain-Ourakat and later in Rome in the College of the Propaganda where he remained seven years.
Returned in Lebanon, he became secretary of Patriarch Joseph Peter Hobaish, who ordained him as a priest on June 13, 1830.

Patriarch Joseph Peter Hobaish consecrated Paul Peter Massad titular bishop of Tarsus on March 28, 1841, and appointed him as his own spiritual vicar. After Patriarch Joseph Ragi El Khazen's death, Paul Peter Massad was elected patriarch of Antioch of the Maronites on November 12, 1854 and confirmed on March 23, 1855 by Pope Pius IX.

One of his first acts as Patriarch was to hold a national synod of the Maronites, in Bkerké, in April 1856, under the presidency of the papal legate of Syria, Paul Brunoni. He called for this meeting not only the Maronite bishops, but also the superiors of the Maronites, the rectors of Latin missions and some notables of the Maronite nation. The purpose of the meeting was to make applicable the decrees of the Maronite synod of 1736 adapting it to the new circumstances. However, the scope of this synod was insignificant, especially since the Holy See never approved officially these acts, which therefore remained a dead letter.

Paul Peter Massad was patriarch during one of the more difficult periods for the Maronites. The 1858 rebellion of the peasants in the Keserwan was an internal conflict that weakened the Maronite society, and it led to the 1860 Lebanon conflict in which the Druzes, with the support of the Ottoman Empire and Great Britain, massacred several thousand Christians. During these events, Massad tried to relieve the suffering of his nation, but he couldn't prevent the bloody war.

In 1867, Paul Peter Massad traveled to Rome with a Maronite delegation that included the Archbishop of Tyre Pierre Bostani to attend the 1800th anniversary of the martyrdom of Saints Peter and Paul.  He was the second Maronite Patriarch after Jeremy el-Amchiti (died 1230) to travel to Rome.  Following Rome, he travelled to France where he met Napoleon III, asking for financial and political help for the Christians of Lebanon. He received from Napoleon III the French Legion of Honour.  He then journeyed to Constantinople where he was received by Sultan Abdul-Aziz and presented with the Ottoman Order of the Medjidie.  He did not personally participate in the First Vatican Council in 1869-1870,  but he delegated the Archbishop of Tyre, Pierre Boustani, to head a delegation that also included the Archbishop of Beirut Tobia Aoun.

A man of culture, Massad wrote several works among which are mentioned: a book of the characteristics of the Eastern Churches; about the procession of the Holy Spirit; a treatise of the perpetual virginity of the Mother of God; several dissertations about the Maronites and a historical account of Khazen family.

From a religious point of view, Massad fully established the Maronite Church within the Roman framework while maintaining many of its own distinctive elements. He died on April 18, 1890 in the Maronite Catholic Patriarchate in Bkerké, Lebanon.

See also

List of Maronite Patriarchs
Maronite Church

Sources

 Pierre Dib, v. Maronite (Eglise), in the Dictionnaire de Theologie Catholique, Tome Dixième, première partie, Paris 1928, coll. 106-107.

Notes

External links
 http://gallica.bnf.fr/ark:/12148/bpt6k105630f/f293.image
 http://www.gcatholic.org/dioceses/diocese/anti0.htm

19th-century people from the Ottoman Empire
1806 births
1890 deaths
Lebanese religious leaders
Lebanese Maronites
Maronite Patriarchs of Antioch